Robert Hibbert (25 October 1812 – 18 December 1833) was an English cricketer with amateur status who was active in 1832. He was born in Cambridge and died in Madeira. He made his first-class debut in 1832 and appeared in two matches as an unknown handedness batsman whose bowling style is unknown, playing for Cambridge University Cricket Club. He scored ten runs with a highest score of 5 and took two wickets. He was educated at Eton and King's College, Cambridge.

References

1812 births
1833 deaths
English cricketers
English cricketers of 1826 to 1863
Cambridge University cricketers
People educated at Eton College
Alumni of King's College, Cambridge